The Southend Cliff Railway, or Southend Cliff Lift, is a funicular in the English city of Southend-on-Sea, constructed in 1912. The lift operated for the first time on Bank Holiday Monday, in August of that year.

Technical details
The line is owned and operated by the Pier and Foreshore Department of Southend-on-Sea City Council, and has the following technical parameters:

Cars: 1
Capacity: 12 passengers per car
Configuration: Single track, with separate counterweight track
Gradient: 43,4%
Height difference: 
Length: 
Track gauge (main track): 
track gauge of counterweight: 
Speed: 
Traction:  electric motor
Weights: car , counterweight 

The line has an unusual configuration, as it runs on a single-track elevated structure. The counterweight track runs within this structure, immediately below the main track that carries the only passenger car.

Operation
The line operates daily between 10:00 am and 3:00 pm subject to the availability of volunteer drivers and weather conditions. In 2020 a fare of fifty pence is charged for each single journey.

History
The line runs on the site of a pioneering moving walkway, a forerunner of today's escalator. This was constructed in 1901 by the American engineer Jesse W. Reno, but soon proved noisy and unreliable due its exposed location. The current lift was constructed by Waygood & Company, now part of the Otis Elevator Company. Since opening in August 1912 it has been modernised three times, in 1930, 1959 and 1990. Each modernisation has resulted in the replacement of the car.

In 2004 the line was closed due to technical problems, and refurbishment was undertaken on the stations. However, during the time that it was closed, the regulations governing its operation changed, requiring modifications before it could be reopened. The line finally re-opened on 25 May 2010, after a restoration costing a total of £3 million, £650,000 on the car alone.

See also
 List of funicular railways
Southend Pier Railway

References

External links

 Southend-on-Sea pier – The Cliff Lift
 Article on Southend Cliff Railway from The Heritage Trail web site
 

Funicular railways in the United Kingdom
Transport in Southend-on-Sea
4 ft 6 in gauge railways in England
1912 establishments in England
Buildings and structures in Southend-on-Sea